Meghana Sunder Raj Sarja  (born 3 May 1990) is an Indian actress who primarily works in Malayalam and Kannada films along with a few Telugu and Tamil films. She made her acting debut in the 2009 Telugu film Bendu Apparao R.M.P. She has won Karnataka State Film Award for Best Actress for her performance in Iruvudellava Bittu, a 2018 Kannada film. She is the wife of late Kannada actor Chiranjeevi Sarja.

Early life 
Meghana Raj was born on 3 May 1990 as the only daughter to film actors Sundar Raj and Pramila Joshai. Her father Sundar has acted in more than 180 films, predominantly in Kannada language, while her mother Pramila Joshai is a noted Kannada film actress and film producer. She completed her schooling from Baldwin Girls' High School and holds Bachelor's degree in psychology at Christ University, Bangalore.

Acting career

2009–11: Debut, breakthrough and setback 
Meghana Raj debuted as a theatre artist, when she was a child, acting alongside her father Sunder Raj in the play Jokumaraswamy. During the audio launch function of the Tamil film Poi in February 2006, she was invited by its director K. Balachander to pursue an acting career, starring in one of his forthcoming films. Accepting his offer, she was given the lead female role in the Tamil film Krishnaleelai, a Balachander production, directed by Selvan. However, despite continuing shooting throughout 2008, which was completed in early 2009, the film got stuck in production hell, and its release got delayed for various reasons.

Even before the release of that film, she commenced shooting for a Telugu film Bendu Apparao R.M.P, which would eventually be her first feature film release. She played the character of a school teacher in the comedy entertainer, starring Allari Naresh and Kamna Jethmalani as well, which released in October 2009 and went on to become highly successful at the box office. She debuted in the Kannada films by enacting the female lead role in Punda, a remake of the 2007 Tamil film Polladhavan. Meghana's next release was her debut Tamil film, the Boopathy Pandian-directed Kaadhal Solla Vandhen, while she also signed up her first Malayalam project, the horror film Yakshiyum Njanum under Vinayan's direction, which was released in August 2010. Although the film was just an average grosser, its glamorous and sensual songs on Meghana was a hit among the youth and made her an instant favorite among the youth. During that time she also acted in two more projects, Nanda Nanditha, which is a remake of the 2008 Kannada film Nanda Loves Nanditha and the Tamil film Kalla Siripazhaga.

2011–13: Beautiful and commercial success 
After a series of flops for most of 2011 where she was seen repeatedly cast merely as a glamour actress, Meghana reverted to winning ways with the Malayalam film Beautiful which was released in the first week of December. The film was a success both commercially and critically and critics widely regarded it as one of the best Malayalam movies of 2011. Meghana's portrayal of Anjali, a home nurse in the film won her very good reviews. Since getting noticed with Beautiful, Meghana got a lot of Malayalam films offers and for a brief period of time was the most sought out actress in Malayalam.

It was during this time when Meghana started to undergo a total physique revamp by going through a strict diet and exercise regime. She made this decision partly because she was getting constantly ignored in Kannada films (her mother tongue) and the reason told was she was fat. 

Her 2012 Malayalam film Namukku Parkkan did a decent business at the box office. Subsequent films Mullamottum Munthiricharum, Banking Hours 10 to 4, Maad Dad, Madirasi and Red Wine failed to perform. However, her next film Memories opposite Prithviraj Sukumaran opened to overwhelmingly positive reviews and was a box office success.

2013–15: Second wind in Sandalwood and continuing success 
After a gap of almost four years, Meghana Raj returned to Kannada films in late 2013 with the successful film Raja Huli,  She followed it with another hit, Bahuparak; her performances in both films were well appreciated. Meghana's next Kannada movie Aatagara was released in late August 2015 to both critical and commercial acclaim and thus achieving a hat-trick of hits in Sandalwood. She is currently concentrating more on Kannada films as she has lot of offers from Sandalwood at the moment. Her next film Vamshodharaka got mixed to negative reviews and thus failed at the box office.

2016 onwards: Dull phase at the box office 

Post 2016 Meghana Raj's releases such as Hallelooya, Lakshmana, Bhujanga and Allama all turned out to be non-performers at the box office. She has committed few more Kannada and Malayalam films as of now. Meghana was recently chosen to portray princess Bhanumati in the Kannada magnum opus Kurukshetra.

Personal life 
After a 10-year relationship with fellow Kannada actor Chiranjeevi Sarja, Meghana got engaged to him on 22 October 2017. They got married on 2 May 2018. Sarja died on 7 June 2020 from cardiac arrest when they were expecting their first child. Their son Raayan Raj Sarja was born on 22 October 2020.

Filmography

As singer 

Television

Awards and nominations 

 2011: The Kochi Times Film Award for Promising Newcomer – Beautiful
 2011: Suvarna Film Award for Best Debut Actress in Kannada – Punda
 2012: Nominated –   Filmfare Award for Best Supporting Actress – Malayalam – Beautiful
 2018: Karnataka State Film Award for Best Actress – Iruvudellava Bittu
 2019: Nominated – Filmfare Award for Best Actress – Kannada – Iruvudellava Bittu
 2019: Nominated – Filmibeat Award for Best Actress – Kannada – Iruvudellava Bittu

Public image 
Meghana's official Facebook page has received more than 2.5 million likes. She was ranked No.19 in the Kochi Times 'Most desirable Woman 2015' poll.  Meghana Raj was also ranked No.10 in the Bangalore Times 'Most desirable Women 2015' poll.

References

External links 
 
 

Indian film actresses
Actresses in Kannada cinema
Living people
Kannada people
Actresses from Bangalore
Actresses in Tamil cinema
Actresses in Malayalam cinema
Actresses in Telugu cinema
21st-century Indian actresses
Christ University alumni
1990 births